The Ministry of Inter Provincial Coordination (abbreviated as MoIPC) is a ministry of the Government of Pakistan. The subsidiary Council of Common Interests or CCI is a constitutional body in Pakistan. The CCI resolves the disputes of power sharing between the federation and its provinces. The ministry is responsible for coordination between the federal and the provincial governments. It aids both the provincial and the federal entities in providing uniformity of approach in formulation of policies that concern both. It is currently headed by [[Ehsan ur Rehman 
Mazari]]  as of   21st April 
2022.

Departments and attached bodies
 Council of Common Interests
 Inter Provincial Coordination Committee
 Pakistan Cricket Board 
 Pakistan Sports Board 
 Gun and Country Club
 Pakistan Veterinary Medical Council
 Department of Tourist Services
 Federal Land Commission
 National Internship Program

References

External links
 Official website

 

Federal government ministries of Pakistan